Building of State Institutions is a building in Tsentralny District of Novosibirsk, Russia. It is located on the corner of Krasny Prospekt and Ordzhonikidze Street. The building was built in 1924–1925 by architect Andrey Kryachkov. In the 1930s, it was reconstructed by S. I. Ignatovich.

The building is a part of the architectural ensemble of Lenin Square.

History
The building originally had two floors. In the 1930s, it had been increased to five stories.

During World War II, the building was occupied by Hospital No. 1504.

Since the 1990s, the building has been occupied by Novosibirsk State University of Architecture, Design and Arts.

Gallery

See also
 Oblpotrebsoyuz Building
 Business House
 Gosbank Building

References

Tsentralny City District, Novosibirsk
Buildings and structures in Novosibirsk
Buildings and structures completed in 1925
Cultural heritage monuments of regional significance in Novosibirsk Oblast